Barahathwa is a city that lies in Sarlahi district. The city is now merged in Barahathwa Municipality from September 19, 2015. The Municipality office is situated in this place.

References

E
Main inhabitants UN map of the municipalities of Sarlahi  District

Populated places in Sarlahi District